Imperial Noble Consort Shushen (24 December 1859 – 13 April 1904), of the Manchu Bordered Yellow Banner Fuca clan, was a consort of the Tongzhi Emperor.

Life

Family background
Imperial Noble Consort Shushen's personal name was not recorded in history.

 Father: Fengxiu, served as a fifth rank literary official, Maci's great great great grandson
 Paternal grandfather: Huiji (惠吉)
 Mother: Lady Jiang (蒋氏)

Xianfeng era
The future Imperial Noble Consort Shushen was born on the first day of the 12th lunar month in the ninth year of the reign of the Xianfeng Emperor, which translates to 24 December 1859 in the Gregorian calendar.

Tongzhi era
In 1872, during the auditions for the Tongzhi Emperor's consorts, Lady Fuca and Lady Arute were both shortlisted as candidates to be the empress. Empress Dowager Cixi favoured Lady Fuca while Empress Dowager Ci'an preferred Lady Arute. The Tongzhi Emperor eventually chose Lady Arute to be his empress consort.

On 15 October 1872, Lady Fuca entered the Forbidden City and was granted the title "Consort Hui" by the Tongzhi Emperor. However, by Empress Dowager Cixi's order, she received the preferential treatment of a noble consort. On 23 December 1874, Lady Fuca was elevated to "Imperial Noble Consort".

Guangxu era
The Tongzhi Emperor died on 12 January 1875 and was succeeded by his cousin Zaitian, who was enthroned as the Guangxu Emperor. In January 1875, Empress Dowager Cixi granted Lady Fuca the title "Imperial Noble Consort Dunyi".

In 1894, just before Empress Dowager Cixi's 60th birthday celebrations, Lady Fuca was honoured with the title "Imperial Noble Consort Dunyi Rongqing". She was the only imperial noble consort in the history of the Qing dynasty to receive a title containing four characters ("Dunyi Rongqing"); imperial noble consorts normally had only two characters in their title.

Lady Fuca died on 13 April 1904 and was granted the posthumous title "Imperial Noble Consort Shushen". In 1905, she was interred in the Hui Mausoleum of the Eastern Qing tombs.

Republican era
On 29 March 1928, Lady Fuca's tomb was desecrated by grave robbers.

Titles
 During the reign of the Xianfeng Emperor (r. 1850–1861):
 Lady Fuca (from 24 December 1859)
 During the reign of the Tongzhi Emperor (r. 1861–1875):
 Consort Hui (from 15 October 1872), fourth rank consort
 Imperial Noble Consort (from 23 December 1874), second rank consort
 During the reign of the Guangxu Emperor (r. 1875–1908):
 Imperial Noble Consort Dunyi (from January 1875)
Imperial Noble Consort Dunyi Rongqing (敦宜荣庆皇贵妃; from 1895) 
 Imperial Noble Consort Shushen (from 1904)

In fiction and popular culture
 Portrayed by Chan Pui-san in The Rise and Fall of Qing Dynasty (1990)
 Portrayed by Cilla Kung in The Confidant (2012)
 Portrayed by Janice Shum in The Last Healer in Forbidden City (2016)

See also
 Ranks of imperial consorts in China#Qing
 Royal and noble ranks of the Qing dynasty

Notes

References
 

1859 births
1904 deaths
Qing dynasty imperial consorts
Manchu people
Consorts of the Tongzhi Emperor